Sebranice refers to the following places in the Czech Republic:

 Sebranice (Blansko District)
 Sebranice (Svitavy District)